is a railway station located in the city of Niihama, Ehime Prefecture, Japan. It is operated by JR Shikoku and has the station number "Y29".It is also a freight depot for the Japan Freight Railway Company (JR Freight).

Lines
Niihama Stationis served by the JR Shikoku Yosan Line and is located 103.1 km from the beginning of the line at Takamatsu. Yosan line local trains which serve this station ply the  -  sector. Passengers on local services continuing eastwards or westwards have to change trains.

In addition, the following JR Shikoku limited express services also serve the station:
Morning Express Matsuyama - in one direction only, starts here for

Layout
The station consists of an island platform and a side platform serving three tracks. The station building houses a waiting room, shops, a JR Midori no Madoguchi ticket window and a JR Travel Centre (Warp Plaza). Car parking and rental are available. The island platform is reached by means of a bridge equipped with elevators for barrier-free access.

Numerous sidings and passing loops branch off on the south side of the station serving a freight container platform and freight yard.

Adjacent stations

History
At that time the station was operated by Japanese Government Railways, later becoming Japanese National Railways (JNR). With the privatization of JNR on 1 April 1987, control of the station passed to JR Shikoku and JR Freight.

On 25 September 2017, JR Shikoku completed a barrier-free upgrade project for the station. The existing footbridge linking the platforms was replaced by a new bridge equipped with elevators.

Surrounding area
 - a bridge equipped with elevators which crosses the tracks, allowing access to parts of the town north and south of the station. The bridge opened on 1 February 2014 and was part of a municipal project to upgrade the area surrounding the station with plazas and parking lots.

See also
 List of railway stations in Japan

References

External links
}
Niihama Station (JR Shikoku)

Railway stations in Ehime Prefecture
Railway stations in Japan opened in 1921
Niihama, Ehime
Stations of Japan Freight Railway Company